Agnes Is My Name is a greatest hits album by Indonesian singer, Agnes Monica. It was released on February 2, 2011 by Aquarius Musikindo and Kentucky Fried Chicken. The album marked her 10-year relationship with Aquarius Musikindo since the release of her first record "Pernikahan Dini" (2001). It also became her final album with the label and with stage name 'Agnes Monica'. The album contains ten songs with eight compiled from her three previous studio albums and the addition of two new songs, "Karena Ku Sanggup" and "Paralyzed". Due to piracy and the critical state of the Indonesian music scene, Agnes Monica's record label collaborated with the Indonesian franchise of the American fast food restaurant, KFC (Kentucky Fried Chicken) to distribute the album in all KFC stores throughout Indonesia. The album was Monica's first album to sell over 1 million copies. The album was available for purchase separately, but it also came with most of the large KFC combo meals, free of charge.

Track listing

Certifications

|}

References

External links
 Agnes Is My Name by Agnes Monica on iTunes

2011 albums
Agnez Mo albums